John Gollings AM (born 1944), is an Australian architectural photographer working in the Asia Pacific region.

Early life and education

John Gollings was born in Melbourne and made his first photographs using his family's UK-built Houghton-Butcher Box Ensign 6×9 cm camera. He learned darkroom processing at age eleven. He attended Hailebury College where in 1962 he made a photograph now held in the National Gallery of Australia, then until 1967 studied Arts and Architecture at Melbourne University, supplementing his studies with architectural and wedding photography.

In mid-career in 2002, he earned a master's degree in Architecture at RMIT University with the thesis "Torus City: investigating the photography of architecture in a virtual environment".

Career 

In the late 1960s Gollings was successful in advertising and fashion photography after joining the partnership of art director Kevin Orpin and advertising photographer Bob Bourne, who became a mentor. After the partners separated, Bourne was replaced by Norman Parkinson’s former assistant Peter Gough, also from London, and Gollings was promoted as the new talent of the studio. At age 22 he garnered the advertising accounts of Shell, Comalco, Sitmar and Marlboro, as well as resorts and hotels like Hyatt, Oberoi and Great Keppel Island resort. Increasingly he also picked up fashion work for firms including Sportsgirl and Levante Hosiery.

Some of his earliest private work, since collected in 2009 by the National Gallery of Australia, was made in New Guinea.

Architectural photographer
After advertising and fashion photography, Gollings settled on architectural photography, in which he has since worked in the Asia Pacific region. In 1973 and inspired by Learning from Las Vegas, Gollings arrived in Surfers Paradise (a well known  holiday destination) from Melbourne, with the intention to extensively photograph the town's architecture, signs and symbols of leisure. 40 years later, building on field work in collaboration with Melbourne architect Tony Styant-Browne, urban planner Mal Horner and graphic designer Julie Jame, he undertook a project to re-photograph the city from exactly the same viewpoints. In the mid-seventies he travelled to Los Angeles to shoot a new portfolio featuring modern architecture and in 1976 he received private tuition from Ansel Adams in his darkroom at Carmel, California.

Much of his work involves long-term cultural projects especially in India, Cambodia, China, Libya and New Guinea. He specialises in the documentation of cities, often from the air. He has a particular interest in the cyclic fires and floods that characterise the Australian landscape, which he documents with aerial photography, and is known for his technique of photographing at night using partial artificial light during extended, or periodic, exposure.

Digital imaging and 3D 
More lately switching to digital imaging, Gollings has combined 3D modelling with photography and the use of drones in the service of his architectural commissions. With Ivan Rijavek, Gollings was the co-creative director emeritus of the Australian Pavilion at the 2010 edition of the Venice Biennale of Architecture. The exhibition was titled Now and When and compared the existing state of Australian cities, and their counterpoint in the mining holes of the west, to the possibility of a radically different, paradigmatic city of the future. The images were either photographed from a helicopter in 3D or rendered in 3D using CGI. The project traveled Australia and Asia under the auspices of the Australian Department of Foreign Affairs and Trade until 2013.

In 2009-2010, with curators Sarah Kenderdine and Jeffrey Shaw and 3D production by Paul Doornbusch and Dr. L. Subramaniam, Gollings presented the Ancient Hampi exhibition at the Immigration Museum in Melbourne. Hampi is a townin Karnataka state, India, that lies in the ruins of Vijayanagara City. The exhibition consisted of a collection of Gollings’ black and white night images completed during his visits over the 25 years from 1980 to 2005, adjacent to images in colour of contemporary India. The second component, PLACE-Hampi, was an immersive media installation of 3D panoramas, sound recordings and computer animation viewed with 3D glasses on a rotating platform.

Books 
Gollings is widely published and his major books include New Australia Style, City of Victory and Kashgar: Oasis city on the Silk Road. In addition to the inclusion of his photography in many surveys, catalogues and monographs on architecture Thames and Hudson released a monograph of his contemporary architectural work; Beautiful Ugly.

Recognition 
Gollings work is exhibited and in many cases, collected, by the Asia Society in New York, the Canadian Centre for Architecture in Montreal, the National Gallery of Australia, the National Gallery of Victoria, the Monash Gallery of Art, the State Library of Queensland, the Janet Holmes à Court collection, the Gold Coast Gallery and the National Library of Australia, and has been the subject of special exhibitions at the Australian Centre for Photography, the Gold Coast Gallery, the Immigration Museum, the Monash Gallery of Art, the McClelland Gallery and the National Gallery of Australia.

Monash Gallery of Art, Melbourne presented a major survey John Gollings: The history of the built world 2 December 2017 to  4 March 2018.

Honours
Gollings received a Visual Arts Board Grant from the Australia Council, has twice been awarded the Presidents Award by the Australian Institute of Architecture and has received many advertising and graphic design awards from Australian, New York and Chicago Art Directors' groups. He is an Honorary Fellow of the Australian Institute of Architects.

In 2016 he was made a Member of the Order of Australia (AM) for "significant service to photography through the documentation of iconic architectural landmarks in Australia and the Asia Pacific region".

Publications 
John Gollings' photography is included in the following book publications:
 
 
 
 
 
 
 
 
 
 
 
 
 
 
 x

References

1944 births
Living people
RMIT University alumni
Photographers from Melbourne
Architectural photographers